Skaneateles is an affluent village in the town of Skaneateles, in Onondaga County, New York, United States. The village is named after, and located on the shores of, Skaneateles Lake, one of the Finger Lakes. As of the 2010 census, the village had a population of 2,450 residents.

History 
Settlers populated the eastern Finger Lakes region rapidly in the 1790s. Water power from the outlet from Skaneateles Lake made the site of the present village attractive.  Although it had been thought that the first permanent white settler in the area was John Thompson, further research has shown that Abraham A. Cuddeback was first, arriving in 1794 from Minisink, New York; Cuddeback died in 1831.  Originally part of the town of Marcellus, the town and village of Skaneateles were annexed from Marcellus and Spafford on February 26, 1830, and March 18, 1840, respectively.

 
The old Genesee Road, which connected Utica, Marcellus, Auburn, Geneva and Avon became the Seneca Turnpike in 1800; the first bridge across Skaneateles Creek was built that year. The Seneca Turnpike, together with the Hamilton and Skaneateles Turnpike, opened in 1826, made the new community more accessible. Isaac Sherwood, founder of the Sherwood Inn, developed a stage coach line through Skaneateles.

The village, which incorporated in 1833 and 1855, attracted prominent residents from an early date.  In 1803 a major New York State landowner from New York City, William J. Vredenburgh, erected an ambitious mansion.  In 1839 Nicholas Roosevelt, "one of the leading industrial entrepreneurs of the period [who] had built the big steam engines for the Philadelphia waterwork", also from New York City, retired to Skaneateles with his wife, Lydia Latrobe – daughter of the noted architect, Benjamin Henry Latrobe.

In the same year, Richard DeZeng, an engineer and canal builder, retired from Oswego, New York to a mansion on the lake.  Acquired forty years later by another member of the Roosevelt family, Samuel Montgomery Roosevelt, the Greek Revival house became known as "Roosevelt Hall."  It may be the work of Ithiel Town, the partner of Alexander Jackson Davis, who designed the house of Reuel Smith, a wealthy Massachusetts importer who retired to Skaneateles. Built in 1852, the architecturally distinguished house, designed in the Gothic Revival style, has been designated to the National Registry; its plans are in the Library of Congress.

Many early residents such as James Canning Fuller came from Great Britain, largely because of the Quaker community here, giving the early village a cosmopolitan tone. Fuller and his wife, Lydia, maintained an active Underground Railroad station at their village home (built 1815, extant at 98 Genesee Street). Fuller was co-founder of the British-American Institute, a Canadian school for fugitive slaves, together with the adjoining settlement of Dawn, near Dresden, Ontario.

For more than two centuries Skaneateles has also attracted visitors and tourists.  An excursion boat, launched in 1816, probably was the first instance of commercial tourist recreation in the Finger Lakes region.

Geography
The village is located at the north end of Skaneateles Lake, in the eastern end of the Finger Lakes District.

The main highway through the community is U.S. Route 20 (Genesee Street), which heads out west towards Auburn. US 20 and Skaneateles also serve as the northern terminus of New York State Route 41 and its suffixed route, New York State Route 41A. It is also the southern terminus of New York State Route 321.

Demographics

As of the census of 2010, there were 2,450 people, 1,094 households, and 674 families residing in the village. The racial makeup of the village was  97.84% White, 0.12% Black or African American, 0.82% Asian, 0.08% from other races, and 1.02% from two or more races. Hispanic or Latino of any race were 1.14% of the population.

There were 1,094 households, out of which 27.1% had children under the age of 18 living with them, 60.4% were married couples living together, 7.3% had an unmarried female householder, and 28.9% were non-families. 25.3% of all households were made up of individuals, and 12.9% had someone living alone who was 65 years of age or older. The average household size was 2.44 and the average family size was 2.92.

In the village, the population was spread out, with 22.9% under the age of 18, 5.3% from 18 to 24, 16.8% from 25 to 44, 35.6% from 45 to 64, and 19.4% who were 65 years of age or older. The median age was 48.1 years. For every 100 females, there were 93.9 males. For every 100 females age 18 and over, there were 91.9 males.

The median household income in the village was $77,456, and the median family income was $117,788. In 2000, males had a median income of $64,524 versus $30,833 for females. The per capita income for the village was $49,957. About 3.31% of families and 6.20% of the population were below the poverty line, including 6.6% of those under age 18 and 3.8% of those age 65 or over.  In 2006, 164 residential properties in the Town of Skaneateles were assessed at more than a million dollars, compared to only two such properties in all the rest of Onondaga County.

Government
The Village of Skaneateles is governed by a five-person board consisting of the mayor and four trustees, each of whom is elected to a two-year term.  On April 1, 2021, Mary Sennett succeeded Marty Hubbard as mayor, the first time a female has held this office in village history.

In the late 2000s, the village was involved in a controversy with the trucking industry which uses Route 20 through the village to reduce travel time and bypass tolls on the New York State Thruway. Most of the truck traffic hauls garbage from New York City to a landfill near Seneca Falls, New York. As of 2008, the state government was considering imposing restrictions on truck traffic. In November 2008, truckers staged a massive convoy through the Village during its popular holiday-time Dickens Festival.

The village lies within the town of Skaneateles, which has its own elected officials and staff. The Town and Village Joint Comprehensive Plan of 2005 examined consolidating the two entities into one government to reduce redundancies and create efficiencies.  In 2009, the New York State Legislature passed legislation to ease such consolidations under the premise that they would create efficiencies and reduce tax burdens.

Local attractions 

The village consists of a small commercial core with surrounding residential streets; the downtown area sits immediately on the lake. There are three publicly accessible parks on the lake within the downtown area. The main commercial streets in the village are Genesee Street (U.S. Route 20), Jordan Road, and Fennell Street. Genesee and Jordan streets, the core of the Skaneateles Historic District, are noted for their mix of mid-19th and early 20th century retail buildings which today contain a mix of retailers, including restaurants, boutiques, real estate offices, and banks. Fennell Street, which has a more industrial history and was the alignment for the railroad spur that served the village until the mid-20th century, contains more of the village's car-oriented retail stores, including a supermarket, pharmacies, and post office.

Village attractions include boat excursions, inns, restaurants and a spa, as well as boutique shopping and art galleries. The summer Skaneateles Festival of music is a seasonal event, as is the annual Skaneateles Antique and Classic Boat Show and the Dickens Christmas in Skaneateles with actors in period costume performing on the streets. The Skaneateles Festival is where famous violinist Hilary Hahn played her first concerts as a young girl.

Historic sites
Properties in Skaneateles which are listed in the National Register of Historic Places are:

Brook Farm
Community Place
James and Lydia Canning Fuller House
Hazelhurst
Kelsey-Davey Farm
Skaneateles Historic District
Reuel E. Smith House

Notable people
 Frances Julia Barnes (1846–1920), temperance reformer
 Harold Everett Porter (1887-1936), short story writer under the pseudonym 'Holworthy Hall'
 Clara Cannucciari (1915–2013), Great Depression cooking show host, author, YouTube personality
 Barry Crimmins (1953-2018), American stand-up comedian, political satirist, activist, author, writer and correspondent, and comedy club owner

See also
 Skaneateles Short Line Railroad

References
Notes

Bibliography
 Baer, Christopher T. "Turnpikes" in Encyclopedia of New York State. Syracuse University Press, 2005.
 Beauchamp, William. "Notes of other days in Skaneateles, written for the Skaneateles democrat in 1876". Cornell Library New York State Literature.
 Ford, Howard S. Sure Signs: Stories Behind the Historical Markers of Central New York. 2002.
 McKee, Harley; Earle, Patricia; and Malo, Paul. Architecture Worth Saving in Onondaga County. Syracuse University Press. 1964.
 Syracuse-Onondaga County Planning Agency. Onondaga Landmarks. 1975.
 Williams, Paul K. The Historic Homes and Buildings of Skaneateles. Auburn, NY: Topical Review Book Company, 1987. Reprinted 1992.
 Williams, Paul K. and Williams, Charles N. Skaneateles Lake. Arcadia - Postcard History series. 2002.
 Winship, Kihm. "Living History", 2005.
 Woodock, Sue Ellen. Skaneateles. Arcadia-Images of America. 2001.

External links

 Skaneateles Chamber of Commerce
 Skaneateles Historical Society
  Skaneateles History at RootsWeb
 

Villages in New York (state)
Syracuse metropolitan area
Villages in Onondaga County, New York
Populated places on the Underground Railroad